The 1979 NFL Championship Series was the 4th edition of the NFL Night Series, an NFL-organised national club Australian rules football tournament between the leading clubs from the SANFL, the VFA and QAFL.

In June 1978 the VFL announced their plans to form a new company to oversee a night series that would be broadcast nationally and Australian Football Championships Pty. Ltd. was incorporated on July 28, 1978 to run a rival national night competition, in opposition to the NFL Night Series. By October 1978, The VFL were joined by the WAFL, TANFL, NSWAFL and ACTAFL in the joint venture and transferred from NFL Night Series to the AFC Night Series. However, the SANFL rejected the VFL's overtures, choosing to remain aligned with the NFL instead. They were joined by the VFA and QAFL in a greatly-reduced NFL Series.

But by May 1979, the NFL, the SANFL and the AFC/VFL held meetings to discuss the future of the series and agree that the SANFL would join the AFC Night Series in 1980 and that the NFL would ceased running their Night Series beyond this edition.

Qualified Teams

1 Includes previous appearances in the Championship of Australia.

Venues

Knockout stage

Round 1

Quarter-finals

Semi-finals

NFL Championship Series final

References

Australian rules interstate football
History of Australian rules football
Australian rules football competitions in Australia
1979 in Australian rules football